The Clinton News-Record has been a tabloid publication in Ontario, Canada in the town of Clinton, village of Bayfield, and surrounding communities, since 1865. It was a broadsheet publication until it changed to tabloid in 2006.

External links
 The Clinton News-Record Official Website

Postmedia Network publications
Weekly newspapers published in Ontario
Newspapers established in 1865
1865 establishments in Canada